Chow Kwen Lim BBS, MBE, JP, (1928–2016) in Shunde, Guangdong, is the founder and the chairman of Chow Sang Sang Jewellery Company, one of the most popular gold and jewellery accessories retailers in Guangdong, Hong Kong and Macau. He was a member of Sham Shui Po District Council and the director of Po Leung Kuk.

References

1928 births
2016 deaths
Businesspeople from Guangdong
Hong Kong businesspeople
Members of the Order of the British Empire
Recipients of the Bronze Bauhinia Star
District councillors of Sham Shui Po District
People from Foshan